Guioa grandifoliola is a species of plant in the family Sapindaceae. It is endemic to Papua New Guinea.

References

grandifoliola
Endemic flora of Papua New Guinea
Trees of Papua New Guinea
Critically endangered plants
Taxonomy articles created by Polbot